Francisco Bravo de Saravia Ovalle (1628–1703) was a Spanish nobleman, 1st Marquess of la Pica and Lord of Almenar.

Biography 

Born in Santiago, was the son of Jerónimo Bravo de Saravia Ossorio de Cáceres and Agustina Lantadilla, descendant of Juan Bautista Pastene. His wife was Marcela Henestrosa daughter of a noble family of Chile.

Francisco Bravo de Saravia Ovalle, was descended of Melchor Bravo de Saravia, was appointed Marquess of la Pica in 1664.

References

External links 
archive.org

1628 births
1703 deaths
Marquesses of Spain
17th-century Chilean people
Spanish colonial governors and administrators
Chilean people of Spanish descent